Mount Wolfenden is a mountain in the Vancouver Island Ranges of British Columbia.

It was named for Lieutenant-Colonel Richard Wolfenden who arrived in 1859 as one of Colonel Moody's Royal Engineers. He remained after they disbanded and became King's Printer in Victoria.

References

Wolfenden
Vancouver Island Ranges
Rupert Land District